Kirikla is a village in Saue Parish, Harju County, Estonia.  It borders Kohatu village to the north, Kernu village to the west, Kustja village to the south, and Rapla County to the east. Prior to the administrative reform of Estonian local governments in 2017, the village belonged to Kernu Parish.

References

External links
Pictures of Kirikla and the neighboring village of Kohatu

Villages in Harju County